The Putnam County Trailway is a paved  bicycle and pedestrian trail in Putnam County, New York. With few exceptions, it follows the former right-of-way of the New York and Putnam Railroad from the northern end of the North County Trailway at the Putnam County line in Baldwin Place north, then east, to Carmel. In 2011 the trail was extended east to Brewster.  In late summer 2018, a final section bypassing portions of Putnam Ave in Brewster, which was formerly closed off with construction barriers and signs, has been opened.  The Brewster station of the Metro-North Railroad is a short distance away.

The trail is also a part of the statewide Empire State Trail, connecting the North County Trailway to the Maybrook Trailway.

The Putnam County Trailway features mile markers giving the distance along the original railroad right of way from its former southern terminus in New York City.  Marker 42.2 is located at Baldwin place, and marker 53 is visible shortly before the northern end of the trail.

References

External links 
 Putnam Trailway, Putnam County Department of Planning
 Trailways/Shared Use Paths and Greenway Systems

Protected areas of Putnam County, New York